Le Tissier is a surname of French origin found commonly on the British island of Guernsey. Individuals with the name include:

Luke Le Tissier (born 1996), cricketer
Matt Le Tissier (born 1968), footballer
Maya Le Tissier (born 2002), footballer

Surnames of French origin